Barthélemy Koffi Baugré (born August 15, 1949) is an Ivorian sprint canoer who competed in the early 1970s. At the 1972 Summer Olympics in Munich, he was eliminated in the repechages of the K-2 1000 m event.

External links
Sports-reference.com profile

1949 births
Canoeists at the 1972 Summer Olympics
Ivorian male canoeists
Living people
Olympic canoeists of Ivory Coast